Whatley is a surname. Notable people with the name include:

 Anne Whatley (1561–1600), said to have been William Shakespeare's fiancée (also spelled Whateley and Whately)
 Bill Whatley (footballer) (1912–1974), Welsh footballer
 Booker T. Whatley (1915–2005), American agricultural expert and professor
 Christopher Whatley, Scottish historian and professor
 David Whatley (born 1966), American business executive
 Dixie Whatley, American television personality
 Ebenezer Whatley (1878–1933), English-born farmer and Canadian political figure
 Ennis Whatley (born 1962), American basketball player 
 Fez Whatley (born 1964), American comedian and radio host
 Frederick Whatley (born 1924), English botanist, biochemist, and professor
 George Whatley (died 1791), English lawyer and friend and correspondent of Benjamin Franklin
 Guy Whatley (born 1975), American organist and harpsichordist
 Jesse Whatley (1895–1982), English footballer
 Mark Whatley (born 1990), Scottish footballer
 Matt Whatley (born 1992), Welsh footballer
 Matt Whatley (baseball) (born 1996), American baseball catcher
 Mickey Whatley (1935–2011), American politician from South Carolina
 Norman Whatley (1884–1965), English educationalist and historian
 Pez Whatley (1951–2005), American professional wrestler
 Simon Whatley (born 1973), English darts player
 Stephen B. Whatley (born 1965), English painter
 Steve Whatley (1959–2005), British actor, consumer expert, journalist, and television presenter
 Thomas Whatley (born 1953), American sprinter
 Tom Whatley (born 1970), American politician from Alabama

Fictional
 Tim Whatley, a dentist on the sitcom Seinfeld

See also
 Whately (disambiguation)
 Wheatley (disambiguation)
 List of Old English (Anglo-Saxon) surnames